Lake Chaubunagungamaug, also known as Webster Lake, is a lake in the town of Webster, Massachusetts. It is located near the Connecticut border and has a surface area of 1,442 acres. Since 1921, the lake has also been known by a much longer name having 45 letters comprising fourteen syllables: Lake Char­gogg­a­gogg­man­chaugg­a­gogg­chau­bun­a­gung­a­maugg. The lake has become famous beyond Central Massachusetts for having the longest name of any geographic feature in all of the United States.

Name
The lake's name comes from Loup, an Algonquian language, and is often said to mean, "Fishing Place at the Boundaries—Neutral Meeting Grounds".  A more fitting translation is "lake divided by islands", according to anthropologist Ives Goddard.

Today, "Webster Lake" may be the name most used, but some (including many residents of Webster) take pride in reeling off the longer versions.  This lake has several alternative names. Lake Chaubunagungamaug is the name of the lake as recognized by the U.S. Department of the Interior, and is the name appearing in the earliest local records.

Algonquian-speaking peoples had several different names for the lake as recorded on old maps and historical records. However, all of these were similar in part and had almost the same translation. Among other early names were "Chabanaguncamogue" and "Chaubanagogum". Early town records show the name as "Chabunagungamaug Pond", which was also the name of the local Nipmuc town (recorded in 1668 and 1674 with somewhat different spellings). This has been translated as "boundary fishing place", but something close to "fishing place at the boundary" or "that which is a divided island lake" may be more accurate.

A 1795 map of Massachusetts indicated the name, using the long-form's first eight syllables, as "Chargoggagoggmanchoggagogg". A survey of the lake done in 1830 lists the name as "Chaubunagungamaugg", the six-syllable older name. The following year, both Dudley and Oxford, which then adjoined the lake, filed maps listing the lake by its eight-syllable form, as "Chargoggagoggmanchoggagogg".  Anthropologist Ives Goddard considers that 1831 name to be a cartographer's creation that corrupted the actual name while confusing this lake with nearby Manchaug Pond.

Long name
The exaggerated name "Lake Char­gogg­a­gogg­man­chaugg­a­gogg­chau­bun­a­gung­a­maugg" is a 45-letter alternative name for this body of fresh water, often cited as the longest place name in the United States and one of the longest in the world.  Many area residents, as well as the official website of the town of Webster, consider the longer version correct.

The humorous translation is: "You fish on your side, I'll fish on my side, and no one shall fish in the middle". Its humorous translation was perhaps invented by Laurence J. Daly, editor of The Webster Times.

Spellings of the long name vary; in 2009, following six years of press reports, the local Chamber of Commerce agreed to have the spelling changed on its signs, but a 45-letter version of the name arrayed in a semicircle is still used. Webster public schools use one long form of the name in various capacities.

Geography

Webster Lake is a  lake with a  shoreline in southern Massachusetts, near the Connecticut border. It is the third largest fresh body of water in Massachusetts, after slightly larger Long Pond, and the much larger Quabbin Reservoir.

The dam initially provided water for a mill, and subsequently the water rights to the lake were owned by Cranston Print Works; currently, the dam is owned by Webster Lake Preservation LLC.

The lake is commonly divided into three smaller bodies of water: North Pond, Middle Pond, and South Pond. They are connected by narrow channels.

Islands
Webster Lake has about 7–8 islands. Some have houses and are habitable; a few are extremely small and uninhabitable. They include:
 Long Island: The largest island in Webster Lake. It has many homes and has electric power lines, underground/underwater municipal water and sewer service, and several fire hydrants. It is in the Middle Pond.
 Goat Island: The second largest island. It has a few homes and boats. It is in the Middle Pond but isolated from the cluster of islands that include Long Island.
 Well Island: A smaller island with one house west of Long Island in the Middle Pond.
 Strip Island: Generally northeast of Long Island and north of Cobble Island with one house, also in the Middle Pond.
 Cobble Island: East of Long Island, in the Middle Pond.
 Little Island: In South Pond, right out of the no wake zone from the Middle Pond, one house.
 Birch Island: Large island on west edge of Middle Pond with Pout Pond on west side and swamp surrounding entire island.  It is located roughly between Treasure Island and The Narrows with access by a bridge on Birch Island Road near The Narrows. There are many homes on island and establishment once called Birch Island Pavilion, now called Waterfront Mary's.
 Small island near east side of Narrows in Middle Pond. May be called either Misery Island or Skunk Island, depending on the map.

Marinas
Webster lake has two marinas:
 Lakeview Marine: The only full-service marine store and service shop on Webster Lake.
 Point Breeze: A restaurant with a small marina. Point Breeze Marina has the only dockside gas pump on the lake.

In popular culture
In the 1950s, a plan to shorten the official name of the lake inspired a poem of doggerel verse which concludes:

Three songs about the lake's name have been written. The first was a regional song from the 1930s. The second, "The Lake Song (Chargoggagoggmanchauggagoggchaubunagungamaugg)", was recorded by Ethel Merman and Ray Bolger and released in 1954 by Decca and incorporates the tale about the lake's name according to the name's inventor, Laurence J. Daly, editor of The Webster Times. The most recent was released in 2010 by Diane Taraz.

The lake is referenced in season 6, episode 6 of Gilmore Girls, "Welcome to the Dollhouse." The character Kirk says, "[It is] an old Nipmuc Indian name. It means you fish on your side of the lake, I'll fish on my side, no one fishes in the middle. Or maybe it means Buffalo."

See also
 List of long place names
 Longest word in English
 Taumatawhakatangihangakoauauotamateaturipukakapikimaungahoronukupokaiwhenuakitanatahu, the longest place name in New Zealand, and the world
 Llanfairpwllgwyngyllgogerychwyrndrobwllllantysiliogogogoch, the longest place name in the UK
 Longest words
 Chaubunagungamaug Nipmuck
 Chaubunagungamaug Reservation

References

External links

 A history of the lake
 NY Times - What's the Name of That Lake? It's Hard to Say
 Listen to the Lake Song
 Webster Lake Real Estate Boat Tours
 MassWildlife Map and Info
 Map of the area watershed
 Lake Chaubunagungamaugg photos 1
 Lake Chaubunagungamaugg photos 2

Chaubunagungamaug
Chaubunagungamaug
Webster, Massachusetts